The Lynchburg Courthouse is a historic courthouse building located at Lynchburg, Virginia.  Built in 1855, it occupies a prominent position overlooking the steeply descending steps of Monument Terrace. The building is executed in stucco-over-brick on a granite ashlar basement and is an example of the Greek Revival.  The building is capped by a shallow dome located over the intersection of the ridges. At the top of the dome is a small open belfry consisting of a circle of small Ionic columns supporting a hemispherical dome. The front of the court house has a three-bay Doric portico.

It was listed on the National Register of Historic Places in 1972.  It is located in the Court House Hill-Downtown Historic District.

Lynchburg Museum
The building is now home to the Lynchburg Museum, which focuses on the history of Lynchburg and the surrounding area.  Gallery themes include history, art and artisans, military history, culture, and the history of the Courthouse itself.

References

External links

City Court House, Court Street & Monument Terrace, Lynchburg, VA: 4 photos, 1 data page, and 1 photo caption page, at Historic American Buildings Survey
 Lynchburg Museum website

Historic American Buildings Survey in Virginia
Courthouses on the National Register of Historic Places in Virginia
Courthouses in Virginia
Government buildings completed in 1855
Greek Revival architecture in Virginia
Museums in Lynchburg, Virginia
History museums in Virginia
National Register of Historic Places in Lynchburg, Virginia
Individually listed contributing properties to historic districts on the National Register in Virginia
1855 establishments in Virginia